Salvador Bernal (born August 13, 1992) is a Mexican footballer who last played for Toronto FC II in the USL.

Career

College and Amateur
Bernal spent his entire college career at the University of Nevada, Las Vegas.  He made a total of 72 appearances for the Rebels and tallied 26 goals and 16 assists.

He also played for Las Vegas Mobsters in the Premier Development League.

Professional
On January 20, 2015, Bernal was selected in the fourth round (70th overall) of the 2015 MLS SuperDraft by Toronto FC.  However, he was cut from camp and ended up signing with USL affiliate club Toronto FC II. Bernal missed the first 15 games of the season due to visa issues, on July 24, he made his professional debut in a 1–0 win against the Charleston Battery.

References

External links
UNLV Rebels bio

1992 births
Living people
Association football forwards
Las Vegas Mobsters players
Mexican expatriate footballers
Expatriate soccer players in Canada
Expatriate soccer players in the United States
Footballers from Michoacán
Mexican footballers
Sportspeople from Morelia
Soccer players from Nevada
Sportspeople from Las Vegas
Toronto FC draft picks
Toronto FC II players
USL Championship players
UNLV Rebels men's soccer players
USL League Two players